This is a list of television series and miniseries about the American Revolution.

 The Swamp Fox – 1959–1960 ABC-TV miniseries starring Leslie Nielsen as General Francis Marion
 The Young Rebels – 1970–1971 television series starring Richard Ely and Louis Gossett Jr.
 The Bastard – 1978 TV miniseries based on the novel by John Jakes, starring Andrew Stevens
 The Rebels – 1979 TV miniseries based on the novel by John Jakes, starring Andrew Stevens and Don Johnson
 The Seekers – 1979 TV miniseries based on the novel by John Jakes, starring Randolph Mantooth
 George Washington – 1984 TV miniseries starring Barry Bostwick
 George Washington II: The Forging of a Nation – 1986 TV miniseries starring Barry Bostwick
 The American Revolution – 1994 A&E miniseries starring Kelsey Grammer and Charles Durning
 Thomas Jefferson – 1997 three-part television documentary by Ken Burns
 Liberty's Kids – 40-part animated television series produced by DiC Entertainment and originally broadcast on PBS Kids from September 2002 to April 2003, since syndicated and seen in repeats on Kids' WB and elsewhere.
 The Revolution, a 2006 13-part mini-series broadcast on History Channel covering the American Revolution from the Townshend Acts of 1767 to George Washington's inauguration in 1789.
 John Adams – 2008 HBO biopic miniseries about John Adams, based on David McCullough's biography also entitled John Adams. 
 Sleepy Hollow – a 2013–2017 American television series that aired on Fox
 Turn: Washington's Spies – a 2014–2017 American television series that aired on AMC
 The American Revolution – a 2014 three-part miniseries that aired on American Heroes Channel
 Sons of Liberty – 2015 miniseries focusing of Samuel Adams, John Hancock, and others.
 Washington - 2020 three-part miniseries about the life of George Washington.

See also
 Founding Fathers of the United States
 Commemoration of the American Revolution
 List of films about the American Revolution
 List of plays and musicals about the American Revolution

 
Television